Champlain Park (French: Parc Champlain; also known as Ottawa West) is an older urban neighbourhood in Kitchissippi Ward in Ottawa, Ontario, Canada. It was considered in the 1930s as the west end of town.  The boundaries of the neighbourhood are the Ottawa River (to the north) and Scott Street (to the south). To the east is Tunney's Pasture and to the west is Island Park Drive. Westboro Beach is also to the west. The population as of the 2016 Census was 1090.

The area was part of the police village of Ottawa West from 1912 until being annexed by Ottawa in 1949. The police village was bounded by Ottawa's city limits, the Ottawa River and the Briannia street car line. Most of the homes were built in the 1920s and 1930s, with the last development in the 1950s. The community association was incorporated in 1991.

Notable buildings include St. George Elementary School, the Ottawa mosque where the Ottawa Muslim Association has their meetings, and the adjacent Hall of Peace, formerly Northwestern United Church.

Recreation
For recreation there is Champlain Park, and the NCC (National Capital Commission) bike path.

References

Neighbourhoods in Ottawa
Former municipalities now in Ottawa